Copperplate (or copper-plate, copper plate) may refer to:
 Any form of intaglio printing using a metal plate (usually copper), or the plate itself
 Engraving 
 Etching
 Copperplate script, a style of handwriting and typefaces derived from it
 Copperplate Gothic, a glyphic typeface designed by Frederic Goudy in 1901
 Indian copper plate inscriptions, ancient Indian records of royal lineages, land grants etc.

See also
Printmaking
Old master print